Alfred Posselt was a Czechoslovak luger of German ethnicity who competed from the late 1920s to the mid-1930s. He won two bronze medals at the European luge championships (Men's singles: 1934, Men's doubles: 1928).

References
 List of European luge champions 

Czechoslovak male lugers
German Bohemian people
Year of birth missing
Year of death missing
Czechoslovak people of German descent